János Bencsik (born 31 July 1965) is a Hungarian politician, who served as Mayor of Tatabánya from 1990 to 2010. He was appointed State Secretary for Climate Change and Energy in the Ministry of National Development on 12 December 2010. He announced his resignation on 2 December 2011. He was replaced by Pál Kovács.

He is a member of the National Assembly (MP) in 1998 and since 2006. He represents Tatabánya (Komárom-Esztergom County Constituency I) since 14 May 2010. He was elected a member of the Economic and Information Technology Committee on 30 December 2011. He is the vice-chairman of the Committee on Sustainable Development since June 2014.

Personal life
He is married to Mária Szász. They have five children together, three daughters - Krisztina, Annamária, Hanga and two sons, János and Magor.

References

1965 births
Living people
Alliance of Free Democrats politicians
Fidesz politicians
Members of the National Assembly of Hungary (1998–2002)
Members of the National Assembly of Hungary (2002–2006)
Members of the National Assembly of Hungary (2006–2010)
Members of the National Assembly of Hungary (2010–2014)
Members of the National Assembly of Hungary (2014–2018)
Members of the National Assembly of Hungary (2018–2022)
Members of the National Assembly of Hungary (2022–2026)
People from Szarvas